Héctor Decio Rossetto (8 September 1922 in Bahía Blanca, Argentina – 23 January 2009 in Buenos Aires) was an Argentinian chess player.

He earned the title of International Master in 1950 and the Grandmaster title in 1960.

He was a five-time Argentine Champion (1942, 1944, 1947, 1962, and 1972).

Rossetto won the Mar del Plata chess tournament in 1949 and again in 1952 (shared with Julio Bolbochán). He also won in Mar del Plata (KIM) in 1962.

He was the director of the 1978 Chess Olympiad in Buenos Aires.

He was a player from the "golden age" of chess in Argentina, led by Miguel Najdorf, with Erich Eliskases, Hermann Pilnik, Carlos Guimard, Julio Bolbochán, and young Oscar Panno.

References

External links 
 Hector Rossetto rating card at FIDE 
 
 
 
 Visa with photo 1947
 Visa with photo 1952
 Visa with photo 1961
 Falleció Héctor Rossetto 

1922 births
2009 deaths
Argentine chess players
Chess grandmasters
20th-century chess players
People from Bahía Blanca